Ventalon-en-Cévennes is a commune in the department of Lozère, southern France. The municipality was established on 1 January 2016 by merger of the former communes of Saint-Frézal-de-Ventalon and Saint-Andéol-de-Clerguemort.

References

See also 
Communes of the Lozère department

Communes of Lozère
Populated places established in 2016
2016 establishments in France